Marguerite De La Motte (June 22, 1902 – March 10, 1950) was an American film actress, most notably of the silent film era.

Early years

Born in Duluth, Minnesota, De La Motte was the daughter of Mr. and Mrs. Joseph De La Motte. She was a 1917 graduate of the Egan School of drama, music, and dancing.

De La Motte began her entertainment career studying ballet under Anna Pavlova. In 1919, she became the dance star of Sid Grauman on the stage of his theater. In 1918, at the age of 16, she made her screen debut in the Douglas Fairbanks-directed romantic comedy film Arizona. In 1920, both of her parents died, her mother in January in an automobile accident and her father in August from heart disease. Film producer J.L. Frothingham assumed guardianship of her and her younger brother.

Career

De La Motte spent the 1920s appearing in numerous films, often cast by Douglas Fairbanks to play opposite him in swashbuckling adventure films such as 1920's The Mark of Zorro and The Three Musketeers. She developed a close friendship with Fairbanks and his wife, actress Mary Pickford.
Her career as an actress slowed dramatically at the end of the silent film era of the 1920s. She did continue acting in bit parts through the sound era and made her final appearance in the 1942 film Overland Mail opposite both Noah Beery Sr. and Noah Beery Jr., as well as Lon Chaney Jr.

Personal life
De La Motte was married twice. She first wed silent film actor John Bowers in 1924, who was then a matinee idol of the silver screen. That marriage ended with Bowers's suicide in 1936. De La Motte later married attorney Sidney H. Rivkin whom she divorced after four years of marriage. Her cousin, Clete Roberts, was an American war correspondent and journalist, who appeared in two episodes of the television series M*A*S*H* in the 1970s.

Later years
After her film career ended, De La Motte worked as an inspector in a southern California war plant during World War II. Later she came to San Francisco, California, where she worked in the Red Cross office.

Death
On March 10, 1950, De La Motte died of cerebral thrombosis in San Francisco at the age of 47.

Recognition 
On February 8, 1960, De La Motte was awarded a star in the Motion Pictures section of the Hollywood Walk of Fame at 6902 Hollywood Blvd., in Hollywood, California.

Filmography

References
Notes

Bibliography

External links

1902 births
1950 deaths
Actresses from Duluth, Minnesota
American film actresses
American silent film actresses
Deaths from cerebral thrombosis
20th-century American actresses